Antonio Ligorio López Altamirano (3 July 1933 – 31 August 1993) was a Mexican professional football forward who played for Mexico in the 1958 FIFA World Cup. He also played for Irapuato FC.

References

External links
FIFA profile

1933 births
1993 deaths
Mexican footballers
Mexico international footballers
Association football forwards
Irapuato F.C. footballers
1958 FIFA World Cup players